The 2nd Independent Division of Liaoning Provincial Military District(1st Formation) was formed in 1966 from the Public Security Contingent of Liaoning province. The division was composed of eight regiments (5th to 12th).

In February 1969 it exchanged its position and designation with 2nd Independent Division of Heilongjiang Provincial Military District and became the second formation of 2nd Independent Division of Heilongjiang Provincial Military District().

Two of its regiments were detached and transferred to 5th Garrison Division of Shenyang Military Region in December 1969.

In late 1975 the division was disbanded.

References

IH2
Military units and formations established in 1966
Military units and formations disestablished in 1975